Dimlit Hate Cellar is an EP by Gnaw Their Tongues, independently released on January 4, 2010. The album compiles some of Gnaw Their Tongues' earliest recordings.

Track listing

Personnel
Adapted from the Dimlit Hate Cellar liner notes.
 Maurice de Jong (as Mories) – vocals, instruments, recording, cover art

Release history

References

External links 
 Dimlit Hate Cellar at Discogs (list of releases)

2010 EPs
Gnaw Their Tongues albums